St. Dunstan's Episcopal High School was a K-12 on St. Croix, United States Virgin Islands. 

St. Dunstan's was founded as a K-12 in 1959 by a committee of parishioners from St. John's Episcopal Church, among them a church layreader Dr. Richard Marshall Bond and his wife Edith Gereau Bond. Dr. Bond suggested the name chosen for the school. As a result of competition with other private and parochial schools, St. Dunstan's folded about 35 years later.

The Episcopal Diocese of the Virgin Islands continues to own the St. Dunstan's campus. The diocese is open to reopening the school, depending on demand. In the interim, the property has been converted into a hostel, with priority going to victims and relief workers if a disaster occurs. It is available for weekly group rental otherwise.

Alumni
 Tim Duncan, NBA basketball player
 Albert Bryan (politician), Governor of the United States Virgin Islands

References

High schools in the United States Virgin Islands
Educational institutions established in 1959
1959 establishments in the United States Virgin Islands
Protestantism in the United States Virgin Islands